We Are Poets is a documentary film directed by Daniel Lucchesi and Alex Ramseyer-Bache.  It follows six young poets from Leeds Young Authors performance poetry group in Leeds on their visit to the international Poetry Slam Competition in Washington D.C., United States. Leeds Young Authors was founded by poet Khadijah Ibrahiim. It premièred at Europe's largest Documentary Film festival - Doc/Fest in Sheffield's Showroom Cinema on 11 June 2011, where it won the coveted Sheffield Youth Jury Award.

References

External links 
 Official Website
 We are Poets at the Internet Movie Database

British documentary films
Films set in Yorkshire
2011 films
American documentary films
2011 documentary films
Documentary films about poets
Works about slam poetry
2010s English-language films
2010s American films
2010s British films